Callistium is a butterfly genus in the family Riodinidae. There are two species both resident in the Neotropics.

Species list 
 Callistium cleadas (Hewitson, 1866) Guyane, Guyana, Amazon biome
 Callistium maculosa (Bates, 1868) Brazil (Amazonas)

Sources
 Callistium at Markku Savela's website on Lepidoptera

Riodininae
Taxa named by Hans Ferdinand Emil Julius Stichel
Butterfly genera